Canoa can refer to:

 Canoa a town in San Vicente, Ecuador
 Canoa: A Shameful Memory is a 1976 Mexican drama film
 Canoa Formation is a Ecuador mountain rage
 Canoa, Cuba is a hamlet in Villa Clara, Cuba
 Arroyo La Canoa a creek in Villa Clara, Cuba